Mimer may refer to:

The Swedish and Danish name of the Norse god Mímir
An iron ore mine in Norberg Municipality, Sweden
Mimer SQL, a database management system named after the Norse god
RoIP, a radio dispatch system
Maharashtra Institute of Medical Education and Research
 Mizoram Institute of Medical Education & Research